Stanislas Ogoudjobi (born 25 March 1977) is a Beninese taekwondo practitioner. He competed in the men's 68 kg event at the 2000 Summer Olympics.

References

External links
 

1977 births
Living people
Beninese male taekwondo practitioners
Olympic taekwondo practitioners of Benin
Taekwondo practitioners at the 2000 Summer Olympics
Place of birth missing (living people)